Harpactus is a genus of hunting wasps in the tribe Gorytini.

References 

Crabronidae
Apoidea genera